Jean Tissier (1896–1973) was a French stage, film and television actor. A prolific actor, he had more than two hundred fifty appearances on screen during his career. He was married to the actress Georgette Tissier.

Selected filmography

 A Rare Bird (1935)
 Return to Paradise (1935)
 The Brighton Twins (1936)
 Nitchevo (1936)
 The Bureaucrats (1936)
 The Club of Aristocrats (1937)
 Sarati the Terrible (1937)
 Hercule (1938)
 Crossroads (1938)
 Alert in the Mediterranean (1938)
 I Was an Adventuress (1938)
 The Little Thing (1938)
 Whirlwind of Paris (1939)
 Latin Quarter (1939)
 Night in December (1940)
 Beating Heart (1940)
 Romance of Paris (1941)
 The Last of the Six (1941)
 The Acrobat (1941)
 The Murderer Lives at Number 21 (1942)
 At Your Command, Madame (1942)
 Adrien (1943)
 The Black Cavalier (1945)
 The Eleventh Hour Guest (1945)
 The Faceless Enemy (1946)
 The Captain (1946)
 Lessons in Conduct (1946)
 Her Final Role (1946)
 Rendezvous in Paris (1947)
 The Ladies in the Green Hats (1949)
 Rome Express (1950)
 Blonde (1950)
 Vendetta in Camargue (1950)
 The Unexpected Voyager (1950)
 The Bread Peddler (1950)
 Messalina (1951)
 Come Down, Someone Wants You (1951)
 Rendezvous in Grenada (1951)
 This Age Without Pity (1952)
 The Beauty of Cadiz (1953)
 The Cucuroux Family (1953)
 When Do You Commit Suicide? (1953)
 Alarm in Morocco (1953)
 A Caprice of Darling Caroline (1953)
 Naked in the Wind (1953)
 My Childish Father (1953)
 Double or Quits (1953)
 Little Jacques (1953)
 Royal Affairs in Versailles (1954)
 It's the Paris Life (1954)
 Adam Is Eve (1954)
 The Count of Bragelonne (1954)
 A Night at the Moulin Rouge (1957)
 And Your Sister? (1958)
 Life Together (1958)
 Marie of the Isles (1959)
 The Enigma of the Folies-Bergere (1959)
 Vice Squad (1959)
 Not Three (1964)
 The Gardener of Argenteuil (1966)

References

Bibliography
 Goble, Alan. The Complete Index to Literary Sources in Film. Walter de Gruyter, 1999.

External links

1896 births
1973 deaths
French male stage actors
French male film actors
French male television actors
Male actors from Paris